The Lone Ranger is an American animated television series produced by Filmation in 1980. The series ran for 28 episodes over two seasons on CBS as part of The Tarzan/Lone Ranger Adventure Hour.

Unlike the 1966 Lone Ranger cartoon, which strayed into science-fiction and comic book plots, the 1980 version stuck to more standard Western fare. The plots included real figures from American history, including President Ulysses S. Grant and Nellie Bly.
Filmation originally tried to cast Clayton Moore and Jay Silverheels, reprising their roles from the live-action series, but couldn't afford the extra day of rehearsal per episode the actors required. William Conrad performed the opening narration over the classic William Tell Overture, with a slight change to the description of Tonto as "fearless Indian friend" vs the original "faithful Indian companion" of the old series. Moreover, for the new series, Tonto spoke whole sentences...in contrast to his more-limited vocabulary from the live-action show.

Episode List

Season 1 (1980–81)

Season 2 (1981–82)

Cast
 William Conrad (credited as "J. Darnoc") - The Lone Ranger  
 Ivan Naranjo - Tonto
 Alan Oppenheimer - Various Characters
 Erika Scheimer - Various Characters
 Jay Scheimer - Various Characters
 Lou Scheimer - Various Characters
 Frank Welker - Various Characters

From 1982–83 season, The Lone Ranger series had continued on CBS on Sunday Morning at part of the mini CBS Lineup at Lone Ranger/Zorro, which ran for 30 minutes in short cut versions, starting with showing Zorro, then The Lone Ranger.

References

External links
 
 

1980 American television series debuts
1982 American television series endings
American children's animated adventure television series
CBS original programming
1980s American animated television series
Television series by Universal Television
Television series by Filmation
1980s Western (genre) television series
Lone Ranger television series
Western (genre) animated television series